Simon Porter also known as Simon Kent (fl. 1421–1451) of Reading, Berkshire, was an English Member of Parliament for Reading May 1421, 1422, 1425, 1432, 1433, 1435, 1437, 1447, February 1449, November 1449 and Mayor of Reading 1427–8, 1429–30, 1441–2 and 1450–1.

References

Year of birth missing
Year of death missing
15th-century English people
Mayors of Reading, Berkshire
English MPs May 1421
English MPs 1422
English MPs 1425
English MPs 1432
English MPs 1433
English MPs 1435
English MPs 1437
English MPs 1447